Newburgh ("new" + the English/Scots word "burgh") may refer to:

Places

Scotland
Newburgh, Fife, a former royal burgh
Newburgh, Aberdeenshire, a village

England
Newburgh, Lancashire, a village 
Newburgh, North Yorkshire, a village
Newburgh Priory, North Yorkshire
Winfrith Newburgh, Dorset

Canada
Newburgh, Ontario, a village

United States
Newburgh, Indiana, a town
Newburg, Jasper County, Iowa, an unincorporated community formerly known as Newburgh
Newburgh, Maine, a town
Newburgh (city), New York, named after Newburgh, Fife, Scotland, by Scottish emigrants
Newburgh (town), New York, adjacent to the City of Newburgh
Newburgh, Ohio, a village that was annexed by the city of Cleveland in 1873; now the South Broadway neighborhood
Newburgh Heights, Ohio

People
William of Newburgh (1130s–1190s), 12th century English historian
Earl of Newburgh, created in the Peerage of Scotland in 1660 for James Livingston, 1st Viscount of Newburgh, along with the subsidiary titles Viscount of Kynnaird and Lord Levingston
Brockhill Newburgh (c. 1659–11 January 1741), Ireland MP, chairman of Linen Board
Thomas Newburgh (c.1695–1779), Ireland, poet

Ships
USS Newburgh (ID-1369), also reported as ID-3768, a United States Navy cargo ship in commission in 1919

See also
Newberg (disambiguation)
Newborough (disambiguation)
Newburg (disambiguation)
Newburgh Conspiracy, what appeared to be a planned military coup by the Continental Army in March 1783, when the American Revolutionary War was at its end